The 2008–09 CJHL season is the 48th season of the Central Junior A Hockey League (CJHL). The eleven teams of the CJHL played 60-game schedules.

In March 2009, the top teams of the league played down for the Bogart Cup, the CJHL championship.  The winner of the Bogart Cup competed in the Eastern Canadian Junior "A" championship, the Fred Page Cup.  If successful against the winners of the Quebec Junior AAA Hockey League and Maritime Hockey League, the champion would then move on to play in the Canadian Junior Hockey League championship, the 2009 Royal Bank Cup.

Changes 
 Orleans Blues become Gloucester Rangers.

Final standings
Note: GP = Games played; W = Wins; L = Losses; OTL = Overtime losses; SL = Shootout losses; GF = Goals for; GA = Goals against; PTS = Points; x = clinched playoff berth; y = clinched division title; z = clinched conference title

(x-) denotes berth into playoffs, (y-) denotes elimination from playoffs, (z-) clinched division.

Teams listed on the official league website.

Standings listed on official league website.

2008-09 Bogart Cup Playoffs

Playoff results are listed on the official league website.

Fred Page Cup Championship
Hosted by the Dieppe Commandos in Moncton, New Brunswick.  Pembroke finished in third place.

Round Robin
Summerside Western Capitals (MJAHL) 4 - Pembroke Lumber Kings 3 OT
Dieppe Commandos (MJAHL) 3 - Pembroke Lumber Kings 1
Pembroke Lumber Kings 5 - Sherbrooke Cougars (QJAAAHL) 2

Semi-final
Summerside Western Capitals (MJAHL) 4 - Pembroke Lumber Kings 1

Scoring leaders 
Note: GP = Games played; G = Goals; A = Assists; Pts = Points; PIM = Penalty minutes

Leading goaltenders 
Note: GP = Games played; Mins = Minutes played; W = Wins; L = Losses: OTL = Overtime losses; SL = Shootout losses; GA = Goals Allowed; SO = Shutouts; GAA = Goals against average

Awards
 Most Outstanding Player - Andy Starczewski (Pembroke Lumber Kings)
 Scoring Champion - Mike Byrd (Brockville Braves)
 Rookie of the Year - Mitch Zion (Ottawa Jr. Senators)
 Top Goaltender - Eric Levine (Pembroke Lumber Kings)
 Top Defenceman - Paul Puglisi (Brockville Braves)
 Top Prospects Award - Andrew Calof (Nepean Raiders)
 Most Sportsmanlike Player - Shayne Stockton (Brockville Braves)
 Top Graduating Player - Andy Starczewski (Pembroke Lumber Kings)
 Scholastic Player of the Year - Justin Rothlingshoefer (Cornwall Colts)
 Community Impact Award - Shayne Thomson (Kanata Stallions)
 Coach of the Year - Mark Grady (Cumberland Grads)
 Manager of the Year - Sheldon Keefe (Pembroke Lumber Kings)

Players taken in the 2009 NHL Entry Draft
 Rd 4 #113 Jeremy Price - Vancouver Canucks (Nepean Raiders)
 Rd 6 #177 David Pacan - Chicago Blackhawks (Cumberland Grads)
 Rd 7 #206 Ben Sexton - Boston Bruins (Nepean Raiders)

See also 
 2009 Royal Bank Cup
 Fred Page Cup
 Quebec Junior AAA Hockey League
 Maritime Hockey League
 2008 in ice hockey
 2009 in ice hockey

References

External links 
 Official website of the Central Hockey League
 Official website of the Canadian Junior Hockey League

CJHL
Central Canada Hockey League seasons